Silent Comedy is an album of solo guitar improvisations by Bill Frisell which was released on the Tzadik label in 2013.

Reception

In his review for Allmusic, Thom Jurek notes that, "This set will most likely appeal to guitar and improv freaks, as well as Frisell's most devoted fans. That said, given its intimate nature, it should resonate wider and deeper than that. He is doing things – on the fly – with his electric guitar and effects boxes that feel more like a conversation with a listener than merely an expression himself for his own sake".

Track listing
All compositions by Bill Frisell.
 "Bagatelle" – 3:11   
 "John Goldfarb, Please Come Home!" – 8:51   
 "Babbitt" – 3:38   
 "Silent Comedy" – 2:02   
 "Lake Superior" – 4:34   
 "Proof" – 3:55   
 "The Road" – 5:20   
 "Leprechaun" – 3:41   
 "Ice Cave" – 6:38   
 "Big Fish" – 5:26   
 "Lullaby" – 3:14

Personnel
Bill Frisell – guitar

References 

Tzadik Records albums
Bill Frisell albums
2013 albums
Albums produced by John Zorn